Minuscule 219 (in the Gregory-Aland numbering), ε 385  (Soden), is a Greek minuscule manuscript of the New Testament, on parchment. Paleographically it has been assigned to the 13th century. It has marginalia.

Description 

The codex contains a complete text of the four Gospels, on 232 parchment leaves (size ). It is written in one column per page, 21 lines per page.

There is also a division according to the Ammonian Sections (in Mark 233, 16:8), with references to the Eusebian Canons (written below Ammonian Section numbers).

Text 

The Greek text of the codex is a representative of the Byzantine text-type. Aland placed it in Category V. Hermann von Soden classified it to the textual family E.

According to the Claremont Profile Method it represents the textual family Kx in Luke 1 and Luke 210. In Luke 10 no profile was made. It creates pair with 2217.

History 

The manuscript once belonged to J. Sambucky († 1584). Francis Karl Alter used it in his edition of the Greek text of the New Testament. C. R. Gregory saw it in 1887.

It is currently housed at the Austrian National Library (Theol. Gr. 321), at Vienna.

See also 

 List of New Testament minuscules
 Biblical manuscript
 Textual criticism

References

Further reading 

 

Greek New Testament minuscules
13th-century biblical manuscripts
Biblical manuscripts of the Austrian National Library